Amora may refer to:

People
 Amora Bettany, Brazilian video game artist
 Amora Mautner (born 1975), Brazilian television director and former actress
 Daniel Amora (born 1987), Brazilian footballer 
 Amoraim (singular: Amora), Jewish scholars in ancient Babylonia and the Land of Israel

Other uses
 Amora (mustard), French manufacturer of Dijon mustard etc.
 Amora (Seixal), a parish and town near Lisbon, Portugal
 Amora F.C., a Portuguese football club
 Amora, a trademarked name for moissanite, a silicon carbide mineral 
 Amora, a sorceress known as the Enchantress (Marvel Comics)
 Amora London, a European touring exhibition dedicated to love, relationships and sexual wellbeing

See also
 Amor (disambiguation)
 Amore (disambiguation)